The Stockport South by-election was held on 3 February 1955.  It was held due to the elevation to a hereditary peerage of the incumbent Conservative MP, Arnold Gridley.  It was retained by the Conservative candidate, Harold Macdonald Steward.

Votes

References

Politics of the Metropolitan Borough of Stockport
Stockport South by-election
Stockport South by-election
20th century in Cheshire
Stockport South, 1955
Stockport South, 1955
Stockport South by-election